Podunavlje was one of the seven municipalities of Novi Sad City between 1980 and 1989. The municipality included city quarters of Novo Naselje, Telep, Adice, Sajlovo and Kameničko Ostrvo, suburban settlement of Veternik, town of Futog, and village of Begeč.

Defunct urban municipalities of Novi Sad